Neomyxine is a genus of hagfish found in the Pacific Ocean around New Zealand.

Species
Two species in this  genus are recognized:
 Neomyxine biniplicata (L. R. Richardson & Jowett, 1951) (slender hagfish)
 Neomyxine caesiovitta A. L. Stewart & Zintzen, 2015 (blueband hagfish)

References

Myxinidae
jawless fish genera